Kazi Abdul Jaleel (Sindhi:  قاضي عبدالجليل) (born  1936 in Rohri), popularly known as Amar Jaleel, is a Sindhi fiction writer and a Columnist whose columns appear in various Sindhi, Urdu and English-language dailies of Pakistan. He has authored 20 books, and received awards including Pride of Performance (Pakistan), and Akhal Bharat Sindhi Sahat Sabha National Award (India).

Early life
Jaleel started writing stories when he was 10 years old. He played for his NJV School and also featured briefly in first class cricket as wicketkeeper-batsman.

Professional career
Amar Jaleel started his career at Radio Pakistan, Karachi before being transferred to Islamabad, where he worked in different positions at radio and educational institutions. Now retired, Jaleel currently resides in Karachi, Sindh, where he spends his leisure time writing articles for various Pakistan newspapers, and is known as a popular columnist for Dawn and The Nation currently working with a private regional Sindhi TV channel as anchor program class room.

Thinking
As a political analyst he has repeatedly returned to one theme: why partition was wrong. Amar Jaleel is a prominent polemicist against the All-India Muslim League.

Criticism 

In 2017, during Sindh Literature Festival, Jaleel read a story خدا گم ٿي ويو (Khuda gum thee wayo, The God disappeared). Video of the session went viral on social media in March 2021. The video irked religious fundamentalists and they took his views as blasphemy of God. Jaleel was threatened to death by religious extremists. His opponents used Twitter and other social media networks to get him arrested and hanged publicly. While his supporters showed solidarity with him.

Books
He has written hundreds of short stories in Sindhi; he has also written one novel in Sindhi titled Naith Gongey Ghalahyo نيٺ گونگي ڳالهايو ("Thus Dumb Spoke").
Some of Amar Jaleel's best known books are:
 Indra اندرا 
 Sindhu Muhinje Saah Mein سنڌو منهنجي ساھ ۾ 
 Dil Jee Duniya دل جي دنيا 
 Jadanh Maa'n Na Hoondus  جڏهن مان نه هوندس 
 Tareekh Jo Kafan تاريخ جو ڪفن 
 Munhinjo Dus Aasman Khan Puchho منهنجو ڏس آسمان کان پڇو 
 Tiyoon Wujood ٽيون وجود 
 Raani Kot jo Khazano رڻي ڪوٽ جو خزانو 
 Jeejal Mohanje Mao جيجل منهنجي ماءُ 
 Chandd Wisaami Wayo.  چنڊ وسامي ويو 
 Adab Aen Siyasat ادب ۽ سياست 
Sarad Laash Jo Safar سرد لاش جو سفر 
Lahndar Sijj Je Laaam لهندڙ سج جي لام 
Sindh Naamo سنڌ نامو 
Sindhu Baqa Ain Maan Fana Ahyan سندو بقا ۽ مان فنا آهيان. 
Aatam katha
He Sindh muhnji ta naahy
Fida Hussain Phdine, Dhani Bakhash Dhane Aen Phndan Ja Kaalum. فدا حسين ڦودني، ڌڻي بخش ڌني ۽ ڦندڻ جا ڪالم
https://www.facebook.com/pages/Sir-Amar-Jaleel-Abdul-Jaleel-Qazi/170964249623560?ref=hl
 Wichaar, a web portal, has printed a book of Amar Jaleel's selected stories in Punjabi translation. The book's title is Amar Kahanian.

Articles and essays
 To Define Sufism
 A Professor with a Fake Degree
 Wither Sufism
 Enigmatic History in a Nutshell 
 Betrayed
 Antithesis of Sufism
 From Nowhere to Everywhere
 The Evil Within Uus

See also
Sindhi literature

References

External links
Urdu Columns of Amar Jalil

Pakistani novelists
Sindhi people
1936 births
Living people
Recipients of the Pride of Performance
Pakistani male short story writers
Pakistani short story writers
Writers from Karachi